Greatest Hits 1998–2008 is the first greatest hits album by Australian recording artist Adam Brand. The album was released on 8 September 2008 and peaked at number 68 on the ARIA charts.

Track listing

Charts

Weekly charts

Year-end charts

Release history

References

2008 greatest hits albums
Compilation albums by Australian artists
Adam Brand (musician) albums